Zafaraniyeh (main street: Shahid Sarlashkar Fallahi) is an affluent neighbourhood in the north of Tehran, Iran. The name's origin lies in the fact that it was the residence of many saffron traders long ago, thus the name Zafaraniyeh (the Persian version of Saffronia). The Islamic Azad University of Tehran, Languages branch is located at the beginning of Zafaraniyeh that teaches English, German, French, Spanish, and other foreign languages. The museum of Sa'dabad Palace is situated at the end of this street, which also contains a culture house. There are plans to build a shopping center in Asef crossroad. The Moghaddas Ardebili Street connects Zafaraniyeh to Velenjak from east and to Valiasr Street and Elahieh from west. Zafaraniyeh is one of Tehran's safest and most heavily guarded neighborhood has due to the many Embassies, residences, head of state, nobles and notables who reside here. There is also a synagogue here. Zaferanieh area has one of, if not the highest household income rates in Tehran. With many wealthy Iranians and non-Iranians residing here, it is regarded as the best and most pricey area of Tehran. 
The area has many Billionaires and Millionaires and many of the residents also live abroad. The area consists of nearly all apartment blocks with only a few houses. It is near the longest city road in Asia, Valiasr Street.

The Tehran Time museum is located in this neighborhood.

External links

 Images of a house in Zaferanieh, Iran Journal of Architecture, No. 14, October 2004.

Neighbourhoods in Tehran